Paul Edmund Soldner (April 24, 1921 – January 3, 2011) was an American ceramic artist and educator, noted for his experimentation with the 16th-century Japanese technique called raku, introducing new methods of firing and post firing, which became known as American Raku. He was the founder of the Anderson Ranch Arts Center in 1966.

Biography 
Paul Edmund Soldner was born on April 24, 1921, in Summerfield, Illinois, his father was a Mennonite preacher. He served as a United States Army Medical Corps during World War II. Soldner served in General George Patton’s Third Army during the Battle of the Bulge, and was awarded a Purple Heart.

Soldner began to pursue a career in art upon returning to the United States after the Army, in 1946 he earned a degree from Bluffton College. He continued his studies and received a MFA degree in 1954 from the University of Colorado. Soldner then turned his attention to studying ceramics and initially focused first on functional pottery. In 1954, Soldner became Peter Voulkos' first student in the nascent ceramics department at the Los Angeles County Art Institute (now the Otis College of Art and Design). As Soldner helped his teacher establish the program, he made several changes to the studio pottery equipment, which led to him founding Soldner Pottery Equipment Corporation in 1955, to market his inventions. He eventually held seven patents related to pottery equipment.

After receiving his MFA degree in Ceramics in 1956, Soldner began teaching at Scripps College. In the 1966, he founded Anderson Ranch Arts Center in Snowmass Village, Colorado. He was also involved in starting the National Council on Education for the Ceramic Arts.

He developed a type of low-temperature salt firing. Along with Voulkos, Soldner has been credited with creating the "California School" of ceramic arts by combining Western materials and technology with Japanese techniques and aesthetics.

While teaching at Scripps College, he organized the Scripps Ceramics Annual - a nationally recognized ceramic exhibition. In addition, as a result of his lifelong friendship with ceramic collectors Fred and Mary Marer, Scripps became the fortunate recipient of the extensive Marer Collection of Contemporary Ceramics. In 1990, Scripps received an NEA Grant to research and organize and exhibition titled, "Paul Soldner: A Retrospective,'" that travelled throughout the United States.

Soldner retired from Scripps in 1991. He lived and maintained studios in Aspen, Colorado and Claremont, California. He died January 3, 2011 in Claremont, California.

Awards 
 1992 Honorary Doctor of Fine Arts from Westminster College, New Wilmington, Pennsylvania.

 2003 Honorary Doctorates of Fine Arts from Bluffton College, Ohio
 2008 Awarded the Aileen Osborn Webb Gold Medal by the American Craft Council, New York City, New York.

Bibliography 
Nothing to Hide Exposures, Disclosures and Reflections  Clay Times Inc., (2008) 
Kiln Construction American Craftsmen's Council (1965)
Makers, A History of American Studio Craft by Koplos, Janet & Metcalf, Bruce; University of North Carolina Press, July 2010, 544 pages, 409 color and 50 b&w photos, notes, index

Film and video

Collections and exhibitions 
Soldner's work is included in the collections of the Victoria and Albert Museum in London, the Los Angeles County Museum of Art (LACMA), and the Museum of Arts and Design in New York City.

Work can also be found in the following galleries:
American Museum of Ceramic Art, Pomona, California. Paul Soldner's exhibition "Inferno" was featured for the opening of the museum in Sept. 11, 2004
National Gallery of Australia, Sydney, Australia
National Museum of Modern Art, Kyoto, Japan
Oakland Museum of California, Oakland, California
Scripps College, Claremont, California.
Smithsonian Institution's National Museum of American Art, Washington, D.C..
Taipei Fine Arts Museum, Taipei, Taiwan

See also 
 Claude Champy, French ceramist who worked with Raku-ware

References

External links

Oral history interview with Paul Soldner, 2003 April 27-28, Archives of American Art, Smithsonian Institution

1921 births
2011 deaths
People from Aspen, Colorado
American potters
American ceramists
Otis College of Art and Design alumni
Bluffton University alumni
University of Colorado alumni
Artists from Colorado
People from St. Clair County, Illinois
United States Army personnel of World War II